Ruma Falk (née Oren-Aharonovich, 1932–2020) was an Israeli psychologist and philosopher of mathematics known for her work on probability theory and human understanding of probability and statistics.

Falk was born in Jerusalem, and educated at the Herzliya Hebrew Gymnasium and Hebrew University of Jerusalem. She completed her PhD on the perception of chance at the Hebrew University in 1975 under the supervision of Amos Tversky, and became a professor there. She was married to Raphael Falk, a geneticist and historian of science.

Falk won the George Pólya Award of the Mathematical Association of America with Maya Bar-Hillel in 1984 for their joint work on probability. She died on August 15, 2020.

Selected works 
Falk was the author of books including:
 Understanding Probability and Statistics: A Book of Problems (A K Peters, 1993)
 אתגרים לתאים האפורים (Challenges to the Gray Cells, Poalim Library Publishing, 2004)
 יש בעיה! (There is a Problem, Poalim Library Publishing, 2013)
 Many Faces of the Gambler's Fallacy: Subjective Randomness and Its Diverse Manifestations (self-published, 2016)

She also created a board game, ברירה וסיכוי (Choice and Chance).

Her other publications include:

References 

1932 births
2020 deaths
Israeli psychologists
Israeli mathematicians
Israeli women mathematicians
Philosophers of mathematics
Probability theorists
Hebrew University of Jerusalem alumni
Academic staff of the Hebrew University of Jerusalem
People from Jerusalem
Israeli women psychologists